Pyrausta sthenialis is a moth in the family Crambidae. It was described by George Hampson in 1916. It is found in Kenya.

References

Endemic moths of Kenya
Moths described in 1916
sthenialis
Moths of Africa